Jack Hombsch is a professional Australian rules footballer playing for the Gold Coast Football Club in the Australian Football League (AFL). He was one of Greater Western Sydney's underage recruits, and played in their inaugural side for their debut season in 2012.

Hombsch was traded to the Port Adelaide Football Club alongside Jake Neade during the 2012 season Trade Week.

In season 2014, Hombsch consolidated himself into Port's AFL squad playing predominantly in the backlines as a tall defender in 24 games including finals. Hombsch continued where he left off playing in 22 games in 2015 and finishing third in the John Cahill Medal at season's end.

At the conclusion of the 2018 season, Hombsch was traded to the Gold Coast Suns.

References

External links

1993 births
Living people
Greater Western Sydney Giants players
Port Adelaide Football Club players
Port Adelaide Football Club players (all competitions)
Sturt Football Club players
Australian rules footballers from South Australia
Gold Coast Football Club players